Nikola Jović (born 9 June 2003) is a Serbian professional basketball player for the Miami Heat of the National Basketball Association (NBA). He was selected by the Miami Heat in the 2022 NBA Draft.

Early career
Jović was born in the Royal Infirmary in Leicester, Leicestershire, England due to his professional basketball player father Ilija playing there at the time. He grew up playing water polo for VK Partizan as well as basketball. Jović was playing basketball for the KK Sava youth system before he joined the Mega Basket youth system in 2018. At the 2020–21 Euroleague Basketball Next Generation Tournament in the Serbian capital Belgrade, he averaged 29.3 points, 10.3 rebounds, 4.5 assists and 1.8 blocks in 28 minutes per game, while shooting 66% from the field and 17% from three and won the MVP award.

Professional career

Mega Basket (2021–2022) 
Jović made his senior debut for Mega Basket in February 2021 at the Radivoj Korać Cup tournament in Novi Sad. On 19 March, Jović made his ABA League debut in a 74–65 loss to Split recording 10 points and 9 rebounds in 21 minutes of playing time. On 10 June 2021, one day after his 18th birthday he signed his first professional contract with Mega.

In the NBA.com GM Survey for the 2021–22 NBA season, Jović received votes for the best international player not playing in the NBA. In April 2022, he was named the ABA League Top Prospect for the 2021–22 season. During the 2021–22 season, Jović averaged 11.7 points while shooting 42.8 percent from the field, 35.6 percent on threes and 75.4 percent from the free throw, 4.4 rebounds, 3.4 assists to 2.7 turnovers and 0.4 blocks per game in 25 appearances.

Miami Heat (2022–present) 
In April 2022, Jović declared for the 2022 NBA draft. On 23 June 2022, Jović attended the 2022 NBA draft held at the Barclays Center in Brooklyn, New York. He was selected with the 27th overall pick by the Miami Heat in the Draft. Jović officially signed a multi-year rookie scale contract with the Heat on 2 July 2022. In July 2022, he joined the Heat for the NBA Summer League.

On October 23, 2022, Jović was suspended for one game without pay for leaving the bench during an altercation between the Heat and the Toronto Raptors the night before. He was assigned to the NBA G League on December 30, 2022.

National team career
Jović missed the 2019 FIBA U16 European Championship in Udine, Italy due to a right arm injury.

In July 2021, Jović was a member of the Serbia U19 national team at the FIBA Under-19 Basketball World Cup. Over seven tournament games, he averaged 18.1 points, 8.3 rebounds, and 2.9 assists per game. He was named to the all-tournament team.

In February 2022, Jović made his debut for the Serbia national team at the 2023 FIBA World Cup Qualifiers, at the age of 18. Initially at the preliminary Serbia roster for EuroBasket 2022, Jović was cut from the squad due to disapproval of the Heat.

See also 
 List of NBA drafted players from Serbia
 List of Serbian NBA players

References

External links

Profile at euroleague.net
Profile at realgm.com
Profile at eurobasket.com

2003 births
Living people
ABA League players
Basketball players from Belgrade
British expatriate basketball people in Serbia
KK Mega Basket players
Miami Heat draft picks
Miami Heat players
National Basketball Association players from the United Kingdom
National Basketball Association players from England
National Basketball Association players from Serbia
Power forwards (basketball)
Serbian men's basketball players
Sioux Falls Skyforce players
Small forwards
Sportspeople from Leicester